Paul B. Loyd Jr. is an American businessman. From 1997 to 2001, he served as chairman and chief executive officer of the R&B Falcon Corporation, the world's largest offshore drilling company, until it merged with Transocean. Transocean has named a semi-submersible after him.

Early life
He graduated from Southern Methodist University in Dallas, Texas with a Bachelor of Business Administration in Economics in 1968, where he played on the football team. He played in the 1966 Southwest Conference for SMU in 1966. In 1967, he was elected captain of the SMU football team and played in the Cotton Bowl Classic. He later received an M.B.A. from the Harvard Business School.

Career
He served as assistant to the president of Atwood Oceanics (acquired by EnscoRowan), president of Griffin-Alexander Company, and chief executive officer of Chiles-Alexander International. From April 1991 to December 1997, he served as chairman and CEO of the Reading & Bates Corporation. From December 1997 to January 2001, he served as chairman and CEO of R&B Falcon Corporation until its merger with Transocean.

He served as a consultant to the Government of Saudi Arabia. He is the founder and principal of Loyd & Associates, an investment company focusing on the energy industry, since 1989. He formerly sat on the board of directors of Enterprise Oil until its merger with Royal Dutch Shell in 2002, and of Vetco until its merger with General Electric in 2007. He sat on the board of directors of Frontier Oil from 1994 to 2011, when it merged with HollyFrontier, where he serves on the board. He also sits on the board of directors of Carrizo Oil & Gas. He has been an executive-in-residence of J.P. Morgan Capital Partners since 2002.

He sits on the board of trustees of his alma mater, Southern Methodist University, and the executive board of the Cox School of Business.

In July 2020, The UK-focused oil and gas company Hurricane Energy has terminated the deal for the semi-submersible drilling rig from Transocean's Paul B. Loyd Jr. Transocean said Hurricane Energy had terminated the convenience contract for semi-sub semi-environment established in 1990. Paul B. Lloyd Jr. is supposed to stay in the UK Continental Shelf until the lease has been cancelled, because it has an agreement with Chrysaor.

Philanthropy
In 2012, he donated US$5 million to SMU for the construction of new student housing building, called Loyd Commons. Prior to that, he donated the Paul B. Loyd Jr. All Sports Center. He also serves on the board of trustees of the Houston Children's Charity and the Boys & Girls Clubs of America for American Samoa. His wife, Penny, chairs the Marshall Plan Charities for Afghanistan and serves on the advisory board of Boys and Girls Clubs.

Personal life
He is married to Penny Requa Loyd and they have 5 children and reside in Houston, Texas.

References

Living people
Year of birth missing (living people)
People from Houston
Southern Methodist University alumni
Harvard Business School alumni
American businesspeople
SMU Mustangs football players